Leucyl-tRNA synthetase, cytoplasmic is an enzyme that in humans is encoded by the LARS gene.

Function 
This gene encodes a cytosolic leucine-tRNA synthetase, a member of the class I aminoacyl-tRNA synthetase family. The encoded enzyme catalyzes the ATP-dependent ligation of L-leucine to tRNA(Leu). It is found in the cytoplasm as part of a multisynthetase complex and interacts with the arginine tRNA synthetase through its C-terminal domain. Alternatively spliced transcript variants of this gene have been found; however, their full-length nature is not known.

Interactions 

Leucyl-tRNA synthetase has been shown to interact with EEF1G.

Inhibitors
 BC-LI-0186
 Tavaborole

See also 
 Leucine-tRNA ligase

References

Further reading